George McIntosh Ramage (born 29 January 1937 in Newtongrange) is a Scottish former footballer.

References

Third Lanark A.C. players
Colchester United F.C. players
Leyton Orient F.C. players
Luton Town F.C. players
Scottish footballers
1937 births
Living people
South Coast United players
Association football goalkeepers
Scottish expatriate sportspeople in Australia
Scottish expatriate footballers
Scottish expatriate football managers